Miyagi prefecture held a gubernatorial election on October 23, 2005. The LDP-backed candidate, Yoshihiro Murai, won.

External links 
 http://findarticles.com/p/articles/mi_m0XPQ/is_2005_Oct_24/ai_n15738283

2005 elections in Japan
Gubernatorial elections in Japan
October 2005 events in Japan
Politics of Miyagi Prefecture